Feradech mac Ross (died c. 557) was a King of Connacht from the Ui Fiachrach branch of the Connachta. He was of the Fir Chera sept of this branch descended from Macc Ercae, a son of Fiachra, the ancestor of the Ui Fiachrach. Feradech was the great-grandson of this Macc Ercae.

Not mentioned in the annals as king, he is however listed in king lists such as the Book of Leinster which gives him a reign of three years after Echu Tirmcharna mac Fergusso (d.556?). Francis J. Byrne places his reign between Echu Tirmcharna and Áed mac Echach (d. 575) who acceded to the throne in 557. In A poem on the Kings of Connaught he is called the fair and a true judge.

His son  Máel Umai was father of a later king Máel Cothaid mac Máele Umai (flourished 601).

See also
Kings of Connacht

Notes

References

 T.M.Charles-Edwards, Early Christian Ireland
 Francis J. Byrne, Irish Kings and High-Kings
 Book of Leinster, Section 30
 The Chronology of the Irish Annals, Daniel P. McCarthy

External links
CELT: Corpus of Electronic Texts at University College Cork

550s deaths
Kings of Connacht
Monarchs from County Mayo
6th-century Irish monarchs
Year of birth unknown